Homero Niño de Rivera Vela (Monterrey, Nuevo León, Mexico,. March 23, 1975), is a lawyer and Mexican politician, member of the National Action Party (PAN) who has served as Federal Deputy of the state of Nuevo León in the LXII legislature of Congress where he voted in favor of the energetic reform and currently serves as Secretary of City Council of the Municipality of San Pedro Garza Garcia, Nuevo León.

Political career 
Niño de Rivera Vela participated in Mexican politics at all levels of government.

As a public servant he held various positions in the federal government during the administrations of presidents Vicente Fox and Felipe Calderon.

He collaborated with Vicente Fox in the presidential campaign, then within his government was Director of Information at the Secretariat of Communications and Transport (2001-2003), Director of Strategic Planning of the Secretariat of the Interior(2004-2005) and Corporate Communication Manager of PEMEX (2005-2006)

In the administration of President Felipe Calderon Hinojosa, he was Director of Social Communication of the Secretariat of Energy(2006-2007); then director of Social Communication of the Secretariat of the Interior (2008-2009) and Executive Coordinator of the Directorate General of PEMEX.

The day October 31, 2015 took office as the Secretary of the City Council of the municipal administration of San Pedro Garza Garcia, Nuevo León 2015-2018

Election positions 
In the federal elections in Mexico in 2012, the National Action Party nominated Homero Nino de Rivera to Federal Deputy for the District 01 state of Nuevo León, where he obtained the victory with more than 50% of the preference of the electorate, being the National Action Party candidate with the most votes nationwide.

Homero Nino de Rivera was the deputy who presented the proposed constitutional amendment to eliminate plurinominal 200 deputies and 28 senators national list, also presented in the same initiative was the motion to eliminate the constitutional immunity for lawmakers and public officials.

References

1975 births
Living people
Politicians from Monterrey
Members of the Chamber of Deputies (Mexico) for Nuevo León
National Action Party (Mexico) politicians
21st-century Mexican politicians
Deputies of the LXII Legislature of Mexico